Marsland Aviation was an airline based in Khartoum, Sudan. It suspended operations in November 2013.

Destinations 
As of December 2012, Marsland Aviations operated scheduled passenger flights to the following destinations:

Egypt
Cairo (Cairo International Airport)
Kenya
Nairobi (Jomo Kenyatta International Airport)
South Sudan
Juba (Juba Airport) hub
Malakal (Malakal Airport)
Rumbek (Rumbek Airport)
 Sudan
Al-Fashir (El Fasher Airport)
El-Obeid (El Obeid Airport)
Khartoum (Khartoum International Airport) base
Nyala (Nyala Airport)

Fleet 
The Marsland Aviation fleet consisted of the following aircraft (as of December 2012)

References

External links 
Marsland Aviation official website
Marsland Aviation Fleet

Defunct airlines of Sudan
Airlines established in 2001
Airlines disestablished in 2013
Companies based in Khartoum